Bergheim is a municipality in the Neuburg-Schrobenhausen district of the state of Bavaria in Germany.

Divisions

The municipality has 3 divisions.

History
The municipality was created on May 1, 1978, from the municipalities Bergheim, Unterstall and Attenfeld.

Similar places
There is a municipality in the same district named Burgheim. There is also a former municipality named Bergheim that is now part of the city of Augsburg.

References

External links
www.gemeinde-bergheim.de — official website (in German)

Neuburg-Schrobenhausen